is a Japan-exclusive video game of the vehicular combat game genre released in 1989 by Irem for the Family Computer.

References
 Gekitotsu Yonku Battle  - FC no Game Seiha Shimasho 

1989 video games
Irem games
Japan-exclusive video games
Nintendo Entertainment System games
Nintendo Entertainment System-only games
Vehicular combat games
Video games developed in Japan